Skowroński (feminine Skowrońska) is a Polish surname.  It is a habitational name for someone from a place called Skowronów, Skowronna, Skowron, or Skowronki, all named with Polish skowronek ("skylark") or skowron ("hoopoe-lark"). In some cases, it is a modification of the surname Skowron, with the suffix added in imitation of noble surnames (see Suffix -ski/-ska).

Notable people with this surname include:
 Andrzej Skowroński (1953–2020), Polish rower
 Anna Bogucka-Skowrońska (born 1942), Polish politician
 Birth surname of Bob Skoronski (1934–2018), American football player
 Janina Skowronska (1920-1992), Polish composer
 Katarzyna Skowrońska (born 1983), Polish volleyball player
 Ken Skowronski, American politician
 Krystyna Skowrońska (born 1954), Polish politician
 Krzysztof Skowroński (born 1965), Polish journalist
 Marta Helena Skowrońska (1684–1727), Empress of Russia
 Paweł Skowroński (born 1984), Polish canoer
 Wojciech Skowroński (1941–2002), Polish singer
 Zbigniew Skowroński (1925–1991), Polish bobsledder

See also
Skoronski (surname)

References

Polish-language surnames
Polish toponymic surnames